Mario Lloret (born 6 September 1957) is a Spanish former swimmer who competed in the 1976 Summer Olympics.

References

1957 births
Living people
Spanish male butterfly swimmers
Olympic swimmers of Spain
Swimmers at the 1976 Summer Olympics